Sør-Trøndelag County Municipality was the regional governing administration of the old Sør-Trøndelag county in Norway until 1 January 2018 when it merged with Nord-Trøndelag county to form the new Trøndelag county.  The main responsibilities of the county municipality included the running of 25 upper secondary schools. It administered the county roadways, public transport, dental care, culture, and cultural heritage.

County government
The Sør-Trøndelag county council is made up of 37 representatives that were elected every four years. The council essentially acted as a Parliament or legislative body for the county and it met several times each year. The council is divided into standing committees and an executive board which meet considerably more often. Both the council and executive board are led by the County Mayor who held the executive powers of the county. Prior to its dissolution, the county mayor was Tore O. Sandvik (Labour) while his deputy was Arne Braut (Centre Party).

County council
The party breakdown of the council was as follows:

Schools
 Adolf Øiens School, Trondheim
 Brundalen Upper Secondary School, Trondheim
 Byåsen Upper Secondary School, Trondheim
 Fosen Upper Secondary School, Bjung
 Gauldal Upper Secondary School
 Gerhard Schønings School, Trondheim
 Heimdal Upper Secondary School, Trondheim
 Hemne Upper Secondary School
 Hitra Upper Secondary School
 Ladejarlen Upper Secondary School, Trondheim
 Malvik Upper Secondary School
 Meldal Upper Secondary School
 Melhus Upper Secondary School
 Oppdal Upper Secondary School
 Orkdal Upper Secondary School
 Ringve Upper Secondary School, Trondheim
 Rissa Upper Secondary School
 Røros Upper Secondary School
 Selbu Upper Secondary School
 Skjetlein Upper Secondary School, Trondheim
 Strinda Upper Secondary School, Trondheim
 Tiller Upper Secondary School, Trondheim
 Trondheim Cathedral School
 Åfjord Upper Secondary School

Transport
Public transport in the county was operated on public service obligation contracts from the county municipality via the transportation authority company AtB AS (meaning A to B) (web site), and operations are performed by Boreal Buss, Nettbuss, Tide Buss and TrønderBilene (buses), Boreal Bane (tram), and Fosen Trafikklag and Kystekspressen (passenger ferries). County road are operated by the Norwegian Public Roads Administration, though managed by the county municipality.

References

Sør-Trøndelag
County municipalities of Norway
Public transport administrators of Norway
1837 establishments in Norway
 
2017 disestablishments in Norway